Syria (SYR) competed at the 1951 Mediterranean Games in Alexandria, Egypt. The medal tally was 13.

See also
 Syria at the 1955 Mediterranean Games

Nations at the 1951 Mediterranean Games
1951
Mediterranean Games